Mistan, in Iran, may refer to:
 Mistan, Hormozgan
 Mistan, Mazandaran